Mason High School can refer to various schools in the United States:

George Mason High School in Falls Church, Virginia
Mason High School in Mason, Michigan
William Mason High School in Mason, Ohio
Mason High School, Mason, Texas
Mason High School (closed) in Tulsa, Oklahoma

See also
North Mason High School